Maine Unko Sajan Chun Liya is a 2019 Indian Bhojpuri-language action romantic drama film directed by Devendra Tiwari and produced by S P Chaudhary, Buchi Singh and Ajay Kumar Chaudhary. It stars Pawan Singh and Kajal Raghwani in the lead. Anjana Singh, Priti Biswas, Ayaz Khan, Vipin Singh and others play supporting roles. Amrapali Dubey makes a special appearance in the song "Bhatar Ko Bhool Jaaogi".

Cast
Pawan Singh as Vijay
Kajal Raghwani as Sona
Priti Viswas
Brijesh Tripathi as Vijay's Father
Ayaz Khan
Lota Tiwari as Vijay's friend
Umesh Singh
Bipin Singh
Jay Singh
Amrapali Dubey in special appearance
Anjana Singh in special appearance

Music

The music of Maine Unko Sajan Chun Liya is composed by Chhote Baba (Basahi) with lyrics penned by Manoj Matlabi, Sumit Chandravanshi, Jahid, Vinay Nirmal and Raj Yadav. It is produced under the DRJ Records Bhojpuri.

First song of this movie Aara Ke Hothlali Lagwalu was released on 5 February 2019 at YouTube official handel of "DRJ Records Bhojpuri". It trending on YouTube and got 7 million views. A second song Bhatar Ko Bhi Bhool Jaogi sung by Pawan Singh and Priyanka Singh was released on 9 February 2019 at same sub-handle. It got 9 million views on YouTube. The songs Rihalsal Kara Di and Chumma Gagari Bhar Ke Diha were released on 16 February 2019 and 22 February 2019 respectively on same sub-handle.

Marketing and release
First look poster of this movie was released on 14 September 2018 and second look poster was released on 14 January 2019.
Trailer was this movie was released on 31 January 2019 at official YouTube channel of DRJ Records Bhojpuri, who also bought his satellite rights. Trailer has cross over 4.3 million  views on YouTube till now.
The film was released on 5 June 2019.
The film is released on YouTube on 15 August 2019 at the official channel of "DRJ Records Bhojpuri". , the film got over 15 million views.

References

2010s Bhojpuri-language films